The Commander-in-Chief, Strategic Air Command (CINCSAC) was the most senior officer and head of the Strategic Air Command (SAC).

List of SAC Commanders-in-Chief

Three out of the Thirteen Commanders-in-Chief of the Strategic Air Command later on served as Chief of Staff of the United States Air Force, General Curtis LeMay, General John D. Ryan and General Larry D. Welch.

List of SAC Vice Commanders-in-Chief

See also

United States Strategic Air Command

References

Commanders
+
Personnel of Strategic Air Command